Kirklin Public Library is a historic Carnegie library located at Kirklin, Clinton County, Indiana.  It was built in 1915, and is a one-story, Classical Revival style brick building on a raised basement.  It features a low-pitched hipped tile roof.  It was built in part with $7,500 provided by the Carnegie Foundation.

It was listed on the National Register of Historic Places in 1995.

The Kirklin Public Library today is one of three active lending libraries in Clinton County.

References

External links

Library website

Carnegie libraries in Indiana
Libraries on the National Register of Historic Places in Indiana
Library buildings completed in 1915
Neoclassical architecture in Indiana
Buildings and structures in Clinton County, Indiana
National Register of Historic Places in Clinton County, Indiana